Yuan Chao (born 16 December 1974) is a Chinese judoka. He competed in the men's half-middleweight event at the 1996 Summer Olympics.

References

1974 births
Living people
Chinese male judoka
Olympic judoka of China
Judoka at the 1996 Summer Olympics
Place of birth missing (living people)
Universiade bronze medalists for China
Universiade medalists in judo
20th-century Chinese people